Rahmonali Barotov (born 10 March 1987) is a Tajikistani footballer who plays for Regar-TadAZ Tursunzoda. He is a member of the Tajikistan national football team in the 2010 FIFA World Cup qualification campaign.

International goals

External links

1987 births
Living people
Tajikistani footballers
Tajikistan international footballers
Association football midfielders